Huỳnh Phương Đài Trang (born 1 August 1993) is a Vietnamese former tennis player.

Trang has career-high WTA rankings of 876 in singles, reached in April 2010, and 380 in doubles, achieved on 23 July 2012. In her career, she won three $10k doubles titles on the ITF Women's Circuit and reached another two $25k doubles finals.

Playing for Vietnam Fed Cup team, Trang has a win–loss record of 4–3.

She made her WTA Tour main-draw debut at the 2010 Malaysian Open, where she was given a wildcard into the doubles event with Jawairiah Noordin of Malaysia. The pair lost in the first round to Vitalia Diatchenko and Chanelle Scheepers, 4–6, 2–6.

Trang has participated for Vietnam at the Asian Games and the Southeast Asian Games. At the 2011 Southeast Asian Games she won two bronze medals, in the doubles and the team events.

ITF finals

Doubles: 7 (3–4)

Fed Cup participation

Singles

Doubles

External links
 
 
 

1993 births
Living people
Vietnamese female tennis players
People from Bà Rịa-Vũng Tàu Province
Tennis players at the 2010 Asian Games
Sportspeople from Ho Chi Minh City
Troy University alumni
Southeast Asian Games bronze medalists for Vietnam
Southeast Asian Games medalists in tennis
Competitors at the 2011 Southeast Asian Games
Asian Games competitors for Vietnam
21st-century Vietnamese women
20th-century Vietnamese women